Leandro Lugarzo (born 20 July 1990) is an Argentine professional footballer who plays as a centre-back for Los Andes.

Career
Lugarzo played in the youth of Lanús and Arsenal de Sarandí. In 2012, Lugarzo was loaned to Primera C Metropolitana's Excursionistas, remaining for the 2012–13 campaign which allowed the defender to make twenty-four appearances. Fellow fourth tier team Dock Sud signed Lugarzo permanently on 30 June 2013, which preceded one goal in fifty-six matches over two years for the club. January 2016 saw Lugarzo complete a move to Deportivo Español of Primera B Metropolitana. His first appearance was also his professional debut, with Lugarzo featuring for the full duration of a draw with Tristán Suárez on 21 February.

Having made sixty-one appearances and scoring once, in September 2017 versus San Telmo, Lugarzo departed Deportivo Español to join Almagro on 22 July 2018. He made his bow on 6 October against Brown. Lugarzo spent the 2019–20 campaign in Primera B Nacional with Guillermo Brown, appearing in a total of eight matches. On 18 September 2020, Lugarzo joined third tier outfit Comunicaciones. In February 2021, Lugarzo joined Los Andes.

Career statistics
.

References

External links

1990 births
Living people
Sportspeople from Avellaneda
Argentine footballers
Association football defenders
Primera C Metropolitana players
Primera B Metropolitana players
Primera Nacional players
Arsenal de Sarandí footballers
CA Excursionistas players
Sportivo Dock Sud players
Deportivo Español footballers
Club Almagro players
Guillermo Brown de Puerto Madryn footballers
Club Comunicaciones footballers
Club Atlético Los Andes footballers